Melissa Conyears-Ervin is an American politician and the current Chicago City Treasurer. She was previously a Democratic member of the Illinois House of Representatives, representing the 10th District since 2017. The 10th district includes all or parts of West Garfield Park, East Garfield Park, United Center, Ukrainian Village, River West, Goose Island, Wicker Park and Lincoln Park in Chicago.

Electoral history

Illinois State House

Chicago City Treasurer

References

External links
 City Treasurer of Chicago's Office

21st-century American politicians
21st-century American women politicians
Chicago-Kent College of Law alumni
City Treasurers of Chicago
Illinois lawyers
Lawyers from Chicago
Living people
Democratic Party members of the Illinois House of Representatives
Women state legislators in Illinois
Year of birth missing (living people)